Vedin Musić (born 11 March 1973) is a Bosnian former footballer who played as a left-back.

Club career
Musić started his career at FK Sloboda Tuzla, where he played in the Bosnian League after the end of the War in Bosnia and Herzegovina.

International career
He made his debut in Bosnia and Herzegovina's first ever official international game, a November 1995 friendly match away against Albania, and has earned a total earned a total of 45 caps, scoring no goals. His final international was a June 2007 European Championship qualification match against Malta.

Honours
Como
 Serie B: 2001–02

References

External links

Profile at TFF

1973 births
Living people
People from Gračanica, Bosnia and Herzegovina
Bosniaks of Bosnia and Herzegovina
Association football fullbacks
Bosnia and Herzegovina footballers
Bosnia and Herzegovina international footballers
FK Sloboda Tuzla players
İstanbulspor footballers
Antalyaspor footballers
Como 1907 players
Modena F.C. players
Torino F.C. players
Treviso F.B.C. 1993 players
Calcio Padova players
Aurora Pro Patria 1919 players
S.S. Arezzo players
NK Čelik Zenica players
Premier League of Bosnia and Herzegovina players
Süper Lig players
Serie B players
Serie A players
Serie C players
Bosnia and Herzegovina expatriate footballers
Expatriate footballers in Turkey
Bosnia and Herzegovina expatriate sportspeople in Turkey
Expatriate footballers in Italy
Bosnia and Herzegovina expatriate sportspeople in Italy